Donatella Finocchiaro (born 16 November 1970) is an Italian actress. She has appeared in more than 20 films since 2002. She starred in The Wedding Director, which was screened in the Un Certain Regard section at the 2006 Cannes Film Festival.

Selected filmography

 Angela (2002)
 Lost Love (Perdutoamor; 2003)
 On My Skin (Sulla mia pelle; 2003)
 Amatemi (2005)
 Secret Journey (2006)
 Ice on Fire (La fiamma sul ghiaccio; 2006)
 The Wedding Director (Il regista di matrimoni; 2006)
 Don't Make Any Plans for Tonight (2006)
 The Sweet and the Bitter (2007)
 Amore che vieni, amore che vai (2008)
 Galantuomini (2008)
 Baarìa (2009)
 Lost Kisses (2010)
 Manuale d'amore 3 (2011)
 Make a Fake (2011)
 Terraferma (2011)
 To Rome with Love (2012)
 Marina (2013)
 War Story (2014)
 Tulipani, Love, Honour and a Bicycle (2017)
 Couch Potatoes (2017)
 Youtopia (2018)
 The Macaluso Sisters (2020)

References

External links

1970 births
Living people
Italian film actresses
21st-century Italian actresses
Actors from Catania